Saint Joseph Mercy Health System (SJMHS) one of the largest health care networks based in southeast Michigan, United States is now known as Trinity Health Michigan. It consist of five prime hospitals, nine Urgent Care Centers, and five Health Centers spread around metro Detroit, providing health care in six counties that include Livingston, Macomb, Oakland, St. Clair, Washtenaw, and Wayne.

Foundation 
In 1911, four Sisters of Mercy arrived in Ann Arbor from Dubuque, Iowa. They came at the invitation of local medical and religious leaders who dreamed of founding a community hospital to serve area residents. That dream became a reality on November 21, 1911, when the Sisters opened St. Joseph's Sanitarium, a small hospital located in a former student rooming house at the corner of State and Kingsley streets.

The little hospital had a nine-member medical staff and 17 beds on the second and third floors, including eight private rooms. Surgeons operated on the first floor, then carried their patients up the stairs to their rooms above. In its first year, 243 patients were admitted.

By 1914, St. Joe's had moved to a new facility on Ingalls Street. In 1977, the hospital relocated to its present location on East Huron River Drive in Superior Township.

Hospitals

IHA Health Services
Merging in 2010, IHA Health Services is a wholly owned subsidiary of St. Joseph Health System. IHA is the largest, fully integrated physician group practice in southeast Michigan, with  approximately 70 practice locations and 650 providers.

References

Hospital networks in the United States
Medical and health organizations based in Michigan
Catholic hospital networks in the United States
Catholic health care